Winwood is the first compilation album of music featuring Steve Winwood. This two-record set was issued in 1971 by United Artists Records and features music which Winwood performed with The Spencer Davis Group, Powerhouse, Traffic and Blind Faith. UA Records issued this album after Winwood's band Traffic left UA when their home label Island Records set up their own American operation. Issued without Winwood's authorization as catalogue number UAS-9950, it was taken off the market after legal action by Winwood and Island Records. It was then reissued with minor changes as catalogue number UAS-9964. Currently out of print, it was issued on CD by Universal Music of Japan for the Japanese market.

Track listing

Side one 
(All songs performed by the Spencer Davis Group unless otherwise indicated)
 "Keep On Running" (Jackie Edwards) – 2:42
 "Somebody Help Me" (Edwards) – 1:57
 "Goodbye Stevie" (Steve Winwood, Muff Winwood, Spencer Davis, Peter York) – 2:22
 "Cross Roads" (Robert Johnson) – 2:32 (performed by Powerhouse)
 "Gimme Some Lovin'" (Steve Winwood, Muff Winwood, Davis) – 2:53

Side two 
(Tracks 1, 2 and 3 performed by the Spencer Davis Group, tracks 4, 5 and 6 performed by Traffic)
 "I'm A Man" (Steve Winwood, Jimmy Miller) – 2:48
 "Can't Get Enough of It" (Steve Winwood, Miller) – 3:37
 "Stevie's Blues" (Steve Winwood) – 3:50
 "Paper Sun" [45 RPM single edit] (Steve Winwood, Jim Capaldi) – 3:26
 "Heaven Is in Your Mind" (Steve Winwood, Capaldi, Chris Wood) – 4:11
 "Coloured Rain" (Steve Winwood, Capaldi, Wood) – 2:44

Side three 
(All songs performed by Traffic)
 "Dear Mr. Fantasy" (Steve Winwood, Capaldi, Wood) – 5:33
 "Smiling Phases" (Steve Winwood, Capaldi, Wood) – 2:36
 "Dealer" (Capaldi) – 3:10
 "Medicated Goo" (Steve Winwood, Miller) – 3:35
 "Forty Thousand Headmen" (Steve Winwood, Capaldi) – 3:11
 "Vagabond Virgin" (Dave Mason, Capaldi) – 5:10

Side four 
(All songs performed by Traffic unless otherwise indicated)
 "Sea of Joy" (Steve Winwood) – 5:19 (performed by Blind Faith)
 "Empty Pages" (Steve Winwood, Capaldi) – 4:30
 "Stranger to Himself" (Steve Winwood, Capaldi) – 3:45
 "Freedom Rider" (Steve Winwood, Capaldi) – 5:25

References

Steve Winwood albums
1971 compilation albums
Albums produced by Jimmy Miller
United Artists Records compilation albums
Albums produced by Chris Blackwell
Albums produced by Steve Winwood
Albums produced by Guy Stevens
Albums produced by Jac Holzman